Madruga is a surname of Portuguese origin. Notable people with the surname include:

Alberto Madruga da Costa (born 1940), Azorean politician
Djan Madruga (born 1958), Brazilian swimmer
Ivanna Madruga (born 1961), Argentine tennis player
Núria Madruga (born 1980), Portuguese actress and model
Pedro Madruga (c. 1430 – 1486), Count of Caminha
Roger Madruga (born 1964), Brazilian swimmer
Teresa Madruga (born 1953), Portuguese actress

References

Portuguese-language surnames